Birdo, known in Japanese as , is a fictional species as well as an individual character in the Mario franchise. Her first appearance was as an enemy in Yume Kōjō: Doki Doki Panic, which was localized for English-language audiences as Super Mario Bros. 2. Since then, Birdo has been a recurring character in various franchise spin-offs. Initially, she was depicted as an antagonist, but has since been depicted as an ally. Birdo has also made several cameos, particularly in the Mario Kart series and the Japan-only Wii video game Captain Rainbow.

The English manual for Super Mario Bros. 2 refers to Birdo as a male "who thinks he is a girl" and would prefer to be called "Birdetta." Some interpret that as Birdo being transgender, which would make her the first transgender video game character. Later releases of Super Mario Bros. 2 removed all mentions of her favored nickname. Starting with Mario Tennis, Nintendo has treated Birdo as a female gender without any more mention of her perceived transgender roots. Birdo is also depicted as being romantically involved with Yoshi. 

The character has received mostly positive reception in the Mario series, although her appearance and perceived gender identity have received mixed reception. She has made several appearances in other media, including the Super Mario Bros. Super Show!, as well as promotional material such as figurines and plush toys.

Concept and creation

Birdo is a pink, anthropomorphic dinosaur creature who wears a red hairbow and has a round mouth that can fire eggs as projectiles. Birdo also wears a large diamond ring. In the early version of Birdo, the character had an orange tone. Birdo's name was mistakenly switched with another Super Mario Bros. 2 enemy, Ostro, both in the manual and in the end credits. The mistake persisted in the version of Super Mario Bros. 2 included in the Super Mario All-Stars compilation, but was corrected in the Game Boy Advance re-release titled Super Mario Advance.

Since the character's North American introduction, Birdo's gender identity has been a target of controversy and speculation. The Japanese manual for Doki Doki Panic, when translated into English, states her name to be Catherine and is a male who thinks of himself as female, adding that she likes to wear a bow and would rather be called "Cathy."  However, in the first edition manual for the North American release of Super Mario Bros. 2, Birdo is referred to by a text block that states "he thinks he is a girl" and would "rather be called 'Birdetta.'" In later printings, mention of Birdo being male was omitted. Mention of this fact is further not included in most later games featuring the character and seems to have been retconned to Birdo always being a female to begin with. In the Japanese version of Super Smash Bros. Melee, Birdo, called Catherine, is described similarly to the original manual, though wanting to be called "Cathy."
 In Super Smash Bros. Brawl, it is said that Birdo is of "indeterminate gender." Birdo appears in the Wii Japan-only video game Captain Rainbow, which delves into Birdo's gender identity. It specifically depicts her being imprisoned for entering the women's bathroom, and the player is asked to locate proof of her femininity (her vibrator) to get her out. Birdo is often lauded as the first transgender video game character. The character was given a female voice actor in Super Mario Advance, a remake of Super Mario Bros. 2. The Spanish language website for Mario Smash Football while describing Birdo suggests that the character's gender is indeterminate. The European website for Mario Strikers Charged Football refers to Birdo as a male character.

In Mario Tennis and Super Mario Advance (a remake of Super Mario Bros. 2), the character was given a high pitched female voice provided by Jessica Chisum and Jen Taylor, respectively. However, in Mario Golf: Toadstool Tour, Birdo uses muttering noises that has been used in subsequent games provided by Kazumi Totaka.

Appearances

In video games
 
Birdo first appeared in the Family Computer Disk System video game Yume Kōjō: Doki Doki Panic and its Western Nintendo Entertainment System conversion Super Mario Bros. 2 as a boss. The Super Mario Advance remake of Super Mario Bros. 2 features a large robotic version of Birdo called "Robirdo." Birdo/Catherine was prominently featured in the cut-scenes for the Japan-only, Satellaview pseudo-sequel of Super Mario USA (Japanese title for the Western version of Super Mario Bros. 2), known as BS Super Mario USA. In this version, three "Super Catherines" were voice-acted by Jun Donna (Pink, described as "slightly mischievous"), Rika (Red, "whose finances are always in the red"), and Akemi (Green, described as "cultured and affluent"). The voices were those of gay men or transgender women. A Japanese advertisement for Super Mario USA also showed a Catherine puppet lounging on a bed, with a low masculine voice.

Since the character's appearance in Super Mario Bros. 2, Birdo has made several cameo appearances, including an early one teaching players the rules of the video game Wario's Woods. Throughout Wario's Woods, Birdo's main role consisted of being the helper to Toad as Birdo provided encouragement to him as Toad attempted to save the Mushroom Kingdom from Wario's clutches. Aside from this brief appearance in Wario's Woods, Birdo has not entered any other Mario mainstream game since Super Mario Bros. 2.

Birdo has made frequent appearances in later Mario spin-off games, including Mario Tennis and Mario Golf Toadstool Tour, first appearing in the Mario sports games with the Nintendo 64 Mario Tennis. However, Birdo was originally going to be included in the Virtual Boy video game Mario's Tennis. Birdo returned again in Mario Golf: World Tour as an unlockable character. Birdo also made her first appearance in the Mario Kart series with Mario Kart: Double Dash, where Yoshi acts as her partner. The European version of the game's manual discusses Birdo's gender in relation to Yoshi. She later reappeared in Mario Kart Wii and Mario Kart Tour. With the release of Wave 4 of Mario Kart 8 Deluxes fourth wave of the Booster Course Pass, she is a playable character in that game, this time in nine different colors. Birdo has also made appearances in the Mario Party series, first appearing in Mario Party 7 then later in Mario Party 8, Mario Party 9, and Mario Party Superstars. Birdo also makes appearances in multiple Mario role-playing games, including Super Mario RPG as a minor boss in Valentina's castle and Mario & Luigi: Superstar Saga as a decoy for Princess Peach, and later Popple's rookie partner. Paper Birdo appear in Paper Mario: Sticker Star, Color Splash, and The Origami King. Birdo appeared in the Wii video game Captain Rainbow, which makes reference to her gender status. Birdo appeared in Super Smash Bros. Melee, Super Smash Bros. Brawl, and Super Smash Bros. for Wii U in the form of collectible items (known as trophies). Birdo has also appeared in Mario Superstar Baseball for Nintendo GameCube and Mario Super Sluggers and Mario Strikers Charged for Wii. She also appears in the Nintendo 3DS version of Mario & Sonic at the London 2012 Olympic Games as a rival, and returns in Mario & Sonic at the Sochi 2014 Olympic Winter Games, once again as a rival. However, she is featured as a playable character in Mario & Sonic at the Rio 2016 Olympic Games, alongside other newcomers like Diddy Kong and Rosalina. Birdo also appears in Super Mario Maker as a mystery mushroom costume for Mario to wear in the Super Mario Bros. art style.

Other appearances
 
Birdo has appeared several times in promotional items, including figurines, plush toys, and other collectibles such as a chess set. A mother Birdo was featured in the episode "The Bird! The Bird!" of The Super Mario Bros. Super Show!, kidnapping Toad due to being nearsighted, and believing Toad to be her lost son Cheepy. "Birdo", the first track of Horse the Band's album The Mechanical Hand, heavily references the character.

Reception
Birdo has received mostly positive reception. 1UP.com editor Jeremy Parish described her as a favourite among fans. Official Nintendo Magazine listed her as one of the "unsung heroes" amongst the Mario series, stating that Birdo does get more exposure than the other characters in this section (she's showed up in a few Mario spin-offs), but she/he's still not as popular as we'd like." In a poll by Official Nintendo Magazine on its users, Birdo tied for eighth-best female character on a Nintendo platform along with Tetra and Kazooie. GamePro editor "The D-Pad Destroyer" called Birdo "everyone's favorite." In Prima's Official Strategy Guide for Super Mario Advance, author Bryan Stratton describes Birdo as the hardest-working boss in video games, due to her appearing more than a dozen times as a boss in Super Mario Bros. 2. N-Sider editor Anthony JC commented that Birdo was a "pushover" compared to the other bosses in Super Mario Bros. 2. In an article on MTV Multiplayer discussing the best birds in video games, Birdo tied for second place with the chickens from Chicken Run. IGN editor Lucas M. Thomas felt that Birdo was nearly as recognized as Yoshi in the Mario sports and racing games. GamePro editor "The Watcher" praised the roster of Mario Superstar Baseball, commenting that while "well-known" characters like Princess Peach and Yoshi make appearances, so do "lesser-known" characters such as Birdo and Dry Bones. In the book Life on the screen: identity in the age of the Internet, author Sherry Turkle uses the pattern Birdo uses in boss battles as an example of something that, while complex, sustains the sense of a reassuring, rule-based world. GameDaily editor Chris Buffa listed her as one of the most unappreciated Nintendo characters, commenting that Birdo had appeared across web sites "in less-than-flattering articles."

However, UGO Networks listed Birdo as the 20th "unsexiest sexy video game characters." Birdo was ranked the ninth ugliest female video game character by ScrewAttack, who described her as resembling a "retarded anteater." ScrewAttack also listed Birdo as one of 15 reasons why they "hate" Super Mario Bros. 2, claiming that they still have no idea exactly what Birdo is. Games.net placed Birdo at No. 8 of their "Top Ten Disturbingly Sexual Game Characters" list. GameDaily listed Birdo as one of the 10 worst Mario characters. MTV Multiplayer editor Jason Cipriano questioned why Birdo and fellow Super Mario Bros. 2 enemy Shy Guy have been included in so many spin-off titles in the Mario series, commenting that they both "kinda suck," but enemies such as Wart and Mouser do not.

Wired editor Chris Kohler described her as well as other characters from Captain Rainbow as "forgettable." IGN editor John Tanaka found Birdo to be one of the more enjoyable guest characters in Captain Rainbow, associating his enjoyment with developer Skip's plot, which involves crossdressing and toilet humour.

Gender identity
Birdo has been the subject of discussion relating to her gender identity and has been perceived as transgender. She has become a trans icon due to her perceived gender identity. She has been credited as an early transgender character in video games. The manual excerpt from Super Mario Bros. 2 about Birdo's gender did not receive attention until some time after the game's release. Writer Lorenzo Fantoni suggested that this was because few people read the manual or because no one cared about Birdo's gender at the time. Fantoni also compared the Captain Rainbow scene to the later bathroom debates regarding trans people. Fantoni also suggests that Nintendo does not know what to do with Birdo and that changes to Birdo's character are made to match present-day morals. Author Sam Greer was critical of Birdo's portrayal, stating that her gender had become a "running joke" and was the "subject of much derision and stereotyping." Paste Magazine's Jennifer Unkle criticized Birdo as a caricatured trans person and as an example of Nintendo's poor handling of gender identity in general.

It is speculated by Wireds Chris Kohler that the gender issue was retconned to make her a cisgender female, while video game developer Jennifer Diane Reitz suggests that she may have undergone gender reassignment surgery. Writer Andrew Webster of The Escapist used the history of Birdo in the lead-in to his article, commenting on the changes Nintendo has made to hide Birdo's gender status.

References

External links
 Birdo at Super Mario Wiki

Anthropomorphic video game characters
Anthropomorphic dinosaurs
Female characters in video games
Mario (franchise) characters
Nintendo antagonists
Nintendo protagonists
Video game bosses
Video game characters introduced in 1987
Video game species and races

pl:Postacie ze świata Mario#Birdo
pt:Anexo:Lista de personagens da série Mario#Birdo
fi:Luettelo Mario-pelisarjan hahmoista#Birdo
sv:Lista över rollfigurer i Mario-serien#Birdo